The 1989 NCAA Division I Women's Lacrosse Championship was the eighth annual single-elimination tournament to determine the national championship for Division I National Collegiate Athletic Association (NCAA) women's college lacrosse. The championship game was played at John A. Farrell Stadium in West Chester, Pennsylvania during May 1989.  

The Penn State Nittany Lions won their second championship by defeating the Harvard Crimson in the final, 7–8. This was Penn State's fourth consecutive appearance in the tournament final (2 wins, 2 losses). 

The leading scorer for the tournament, with 6 goals, was Karen Everling, from Harvard. The Most Outstanding Player trophy was not awarded this year.

Teams 
All NCAA Division I women's lacrosse programs were eligible for this championship. Ultimately, 6 teams were invited to participate in this single-elimination tournament.

Tournament bracket

Tournament outstanding players 
Lisi Bailliere, Harvard
Katie McAnaney, Harvard
Cheri McMonagle, Penn State
Diane Whipple, Penn State
Tami Worley, Penn State
Demer Holleran, Princeton

See also 
 NCAA Division I Women's Lacrosse Championship
 NCAA Division III Women's Lacrosse Championship
 1989 NCAA Division I Men's Lacrosse Championship

References

NCAA Division I Women's Lacrosse Championship
NCAA Division I Women's Lacrosse Championship
NCAA Women's Lacrosse Championship